Mikhail Ivanovich Naidov (20 October 1932 – 13 February 2022) was a Russian miner and politician.

A member of the Communist Party, he served as Chairman of the executive committee of the Kemerovo Regional Council of People's Deputies from May to December 1990. He died in Kemerovo on 13 February 2022, at the age of 89.

References

1932 births
2022 deaths
Soviet politicians
20th-century Russian politicians
Russian miners
Russian mining engineers
Communist Party of the Soviet Union members
Tomsk Polytechnic University alumni
Recipients of the Order of the Red Banner of Labour
People from Kemerovo Oblast